Great Britain and Northern Ireland competed at the 2019 IAAF World Championships in Doha, from 27 September–6 October 2019. The nation won five medals at the championships – two gold medals, and three silvers. Dina Asher-Smith became the first British person to win three medals at a single championships, winning the women's 200 metres, taking silver in the Women's 100 metres, then getting another silver in the women's 4 × 100 metres relay. Asher-Smith broke the British records in both the 100 m and 200 m. She was Britain's first female sprint champion. Katarina Johnson-Thompson was the only other Briton to win an individual medal, taking the heptathlon gold medal with a British record score. The British men's 4 × 100 metres relay quarter (Adam Gemili, Zharnel Hughes, Richard Kilty, Nethaneel Mitchell-Blake) ran a European record of 37.36 seconds to take a silver medal. The women's 4 × 400 metres relay team was briefly upgraded to the bronze medal, but the original medallists Jamaica were reinstated on appeal. Great Britain won the lowest number of medals since its performance at the 2005 World Championships in Athletics.

Domestic television coverage was broadcast by the BBC, with Gabby Logan and Jeanette Kwakye presenting, former Olympic champions Michael Johnson, Denise Lewis, Jessica Ennis-Hill and Daley Thompson providing analysis, Radzi Chinyanganya and triple jumper Naomi Ogbeta on reportage, and commentary being given by Steve Cram, Andrew Cotter, Paula Radcliffe, Steve Backley, Colin Jackson and Toni Minichiello, and Mark Butler returning as statistician.

Medallists

† Ran in heats only

Results

Men
Track and road events

* – Indicates the athlete competed in preliminaries but not the final

Field events

Combined events – Decathlon

Women
Track and road events

* – Indicates the athlete competed in preliminaries but not the final

Field events

Combined events – Heptathlon

Mixed

References

Nations at the 2019 World Athletics Championships
World Championships in Athletics
Great Britain and Northern Ireland at the World Championships in Athletics